Yudo Auto is a Chinese electric vehicle marque owned by Fujian Motors Group introduced in 2017.

History
In February 2017, Fujian Motors Group introduced the Yudo Auto marque with the π1, which is based on the Haval H1, and the π3 electric subcompact crossovers. The Chinese name is Yundu, and the brand slogan is “creating for change”.

In April 2017 at Auto Shanghai 2017, the Yudo π1 and π3 were officially revealed to the public and the X-π concept SUV was revealed.

In April 2018 at Auto China 2018 in Beijing, the Yudo π7 compact SUV concept was revealed.

In 2020, Yudo Auto introduced the V01L electric cargo van.

Models

Production cars

Concept vehicles

References

Vehicle manufacturing companies established in 2018
Electric vehicle manufacturers of China